Mecistocephalus heteropus is a species of centipedes in the family Mecistocephalidae. It is endemic to Sri Lanka. This species has 49 pairs of legs.

References

External links
Diversity in the maxillipede dentition of Mecistocephalus centipedes (Chilopoda, Mecistocephalidae), with the description of a new species with unusually elongate denticles

heteropus
Animals described in 1865
Endemic fauna of Sri Lanka